Palazzo Bellavite is a 16th-century Venetian palace, located in Campo San Maurizio, in the San Marco district. It is also known as Palazzo Bellavite Baffo, because the last member of the Baffo family lived there.

History
Tha palace was commissioned by Dionisio Bellavite, a wealthy flour and oil merchant, in the early 16th century in place of the old bell tower of the church of San Maurizio. The façade was originally painted by Paolo Veronese with no traces remaining today. Poet Giorgio Baffo lived in the palace until his death in 1768; therefore, the structure is also known as Casa Baffo. Italian poet and novelist Alessandro Manzoni lived in the palazzo in 1803–1804. There are two stone plaques commemorating both poets on the palazzo façade.

Architecture
The building has four levels with two in the middle designed as noble floors. The latter ones are decorated by serlianas flanked by pairs of single-light windows. The interiors are of 18th century with frescoes attributed to Pietro Antonio Novelli. Once a prestigious residential palazzo, the building is nowadays home to a study center and offices.

Gallery

References

Houses completed in the 16th century
Bellavite
Baroque architecture in Venice